The Last Time I Saw Her is the 20th album by American singer/guitarist Glen Campbell, released by Capitol Records in 1971 (see 1971 in music).

Track listing
Side 1: 
 "The Last Time I Saw Her" (Gordon Lightfoot) – 4:06
 "Rose Garden" (Joe South) – 2:44
 "Help Me Make It Through the Night" (Kris Kristofferson) – 2:18
 "She Understands Me" (Jerry Hubbard) – 2:34
 "He Ain't Heavy, He's My Brother" (Bobby Scott, Bob Russell) – 3:25
 
Side 2:
 "If You Could Read My Mind" (Gordon Lightfoot) – 3:45
 "Dream Baby (How Long Must I Dream)" (Cindy Walker) – 2:37
 "Today Is Mine" (Jerry Hubbard) – 3:37
 "Here We Go Again" (Russell Steagall, Don Lanier) – 2:26
 "Theme From 'Love Story'" (Francis Lai, Carl Sigman) – 3:01

Personnel
Glen Campbell – vocals, acoustic guitar
Larry McNeely – acoustic guitar
Louis Shelton – acoustic guitar
Hal Blaine – drums
Carol Kaye – bass guitar
Bill Graham – bass guitar

Production
Producer – Al De Lory
Arranged and conducted by Al De Lory and Marty Paich
Engineer – Chuck Britz
Photography – Rick Rankin
Liner photo – Frank Laffitte

Charts
Album – Billboard (United States)

Singles – Billboard (United States)

References

Glen Campbell albums
1971 albums
Albums arranged by Marty Paich
Capitol Records albums